Hillside Historic District may refer to:

Hillside Historic District (Waterbury, Connecticut), listed on the National Register of Historic Places (NRHP)
Hillside Historic District (Chehalis, Washington), listed on the NRHP in Lewis County, Washington

See also
Hillside Avenue Historic District (disambiguation)
Hillside (disambiguation)